This is a list of characters from the Turkish TV series Diriliş: Ertuğrul, created by Mehmet Bozdağ. It focuses on the life of Ertuğrul, father of Osman I, founder of the Ottoman Empire. In the series, Ertuğrul is portrayed by Engin Altan Düzyatan and Osman is portrayed by Emre Üçtepe.

Most of the notable characters in Diriliş: Ertuğrul are based on real people related to Osman I and the founding of the Ottoman Empire, including Osman I himself, Halime Hatun and Ertuğrul, or fictional characters adapted from the Book of Dede Korkut, such as Selcan Hatun, Banu Çiçek and Bamsı Beyrek. Most of the characters however, were created by the producers of the series as there were just not that many sources from the era.

Every season has additional cast members starring with a main role. In the first season, Serdar Deniz , Hakan Vanlı  and Serdar Gökhan were additional members of the main cast. In season 2, Uğur Güneş, Cavit Çetin Güner and Barış Bağcı were starring as the main cast, and in season 3, Kürşat Alnıaçık , Çağdaş Onur Öztürk  and Cem Uçan were credited as the main cast. In season 4 and 5, Murat Garipağaoğlu , Burak Dakak, Cemal Hünal, Ali Ersan Duru and İlker Aksum were main actors.

Cast table 
This is an overview of the cast in the series, some characters, who made little appearance, mainly minor or guest characters, are not shown here but are shown in the articles for each season. Supporting characters and minor characters (if mentioned) are classed as recurring characters here.

Notes

This is a list of all characters first and last appearances/death episodes. All episodes are referred to Netflix episodes

Main characters

Ertuğrul Bey 

Ertuğrul Bey (Season 1–5) portrayed by Engin Altan Düzyatan is the main protagonist of the series. He is the third son of Süleyman Şah and second biological son of Hayme Hatun. He is the half-brother of Gündoğdu Bey, the brother of Sungurtekin Bey and Dündar Bey, and the adoptive brother of Selcan, Gökçe, Turgut, Bamsı and Doğan. He is the widower of Halime Hatun and the husband of İlbilge Hatun, the father of Gündüz Bey, Savcı Bey and Osman Bey. After the death of his father, he battled the invading Mongols before splitting with his brothers and leading a portion of the tribe to the western borders of the Sultanate of Rum and established himself as the Bey of his own Kayı tribe. He later became a senior operative of Sultan Alaeddin Keykubat and Sultan Gıyaseddin. He conquered Hanlı Pazar (public market) and earned the title of "Uç Bey" (margrave or Principality Bey) of the westernmost principality of the sultanate. As an Uç Bey, he conquered Karacahisar Castle. He is one of the only major beys to not be corrupted by the Mongols, which leads to his head being a target for Mongol and Selçuk operatives. He returns as an old man in the sequel, Kuruluş: Osman, portrayed by Tamer Yiğit. Based on Ertuğrul.

Turgut Alp 

Turgut Alp (Season 1–5) portrayed by Cengiz Coşkun is the son of Konur Alp, adoptive brother of Ertuğrul Bey and the blood brother of Bamsı Beyrek and Doğan Alp. He is one of the three main alps of Ertuğrul along with his blood brothers. Turgut is Ertuğrul's best friend and the adoptive son of Süleyman Şah and Hayme Hatun. He is also the widower of Aykız Hatun and Aslıhan Hatun. In season 1 Turgut was captured by the Templars and was tortured and brainwashed into becoming a knight named 'Judas'. After Turgut comes back to his senses, he marries Aykız, his childhood sweetheart. At the end of season 2, after losing his wife and father-in-law, he is appointed Alpbaşı of the Kayı tribe. He becomes Ertuğrul's spy in Hanlı Pazar before becoming Bey of the Çavdar tribe through his marriage to Aslıhan Hatun. In season 5, he works along with Mergen for Ertuğrul as a spy, fights with an axe instead of a traditional sword. He is mentioned in the sequel, Kuruluş: Osman but not shown.

Aliases: 
Judas (when brainwashed)
Turgut Bey
Turgut Alpbaşı

Halime Hatun 

Halime Hatun (Season 1–4) portrayed by Esra Bilgiç is the wife of Ertuğrul and the mother of Gündüz Alp, Savcı Bey, and Osman Bey. Daughter-in-law of Hayme Hatun, who she treats as her own mother. She is the daughter of Şehzade Numan, the older sister of Yiğit Alp and niece of Sultan Alaeddin Keykubat. She became the Hanım of the Kayı tribe after Ertuğrul became the Bey of the Kayı. She fought against many enemies along with her husband and is very faithful to her husband and his cause. She was very valiant and often fought along with her family in order to protect her tribe. In season 1, she was hated by Selcan and Gökçe but later become great friends with them and treated each other like sisters. She was also being forced to marry Emir El Aziz by her father despite she loved Ertuğrul. In season 3, she had tough relations with Aslıhan, who loved Ertuğrul and wanted to marry him but later they became good friends. She dies from childbirth after giving birth to Osman. She is frequently mentioned in the sequel, Kuruluş: Osman. Based on Halime Hatun.

Aliases: 
 Halime Sultan
 "Ceylan" (nickname given by Ertuğrul)

Bamsı Beyrek 

Bamsı Beyrek (Season 1–2 supporting, Season 3–5 starring) portrayed by Nurettin Sönmez is the son of Altuğ Alp, adoptive brother of Ertuğrul and blood-brother of Turgut Alp and Doğan Alp. He is one of the three main alps of Ertuğrul along with his blood brothers. Bamsı is also the adoptive son of Süleyman Şah and Hayme Hatun, husband of Hafsa Hatun and father of Aslıhan and Aybars. He is very loyal and good-hearted, somewhat slow-thinking, and prone to emotional outbursts. He also fights with two swords and is loyal to Ertuğrul and enjoys fighting against the enemy. He is a keen story teller, often referencing stories from the Book of Dede Korkut. Sönmez does not appear in part of the second season due to a foot injury incurred in a motorcycle accident.  He became the Chief Alp of the Kayı tribe after Turgut's marriage to Aslıhan Hatun. He returns in the sequel, Kuruluş: Osman. Loosely based on Bamsi Beyrek, a character in the Book of Dede Korkut, whose story was referenced by Bamsı in season 3.

Aliases:
 Bamsı Alp
 Bamsı Bey
 Bamsı Alpbaşı
 "Dağ Ayısı" (nickname)

Hayme Hatun 

Hayme Hatun (Season 1–5) portrayed by Hülya Darcan is the mother of Ertuğrul, Dündar and Sungurtekin and stepmother of Gündoğdu. She is the widow of Süleyman Şah, adoptive mother of Selcan, Gökçe, Turgut, Doğan and Bamsı. Younger sister of Korkut Bey. Treated by Halime as a mother. She is mentioned to have had two more sons or step-sons, killed by Mongols. Hanım of the Kayı tribe and has a strong personality and is a constant source of guidance, wisdom and encouragement for her family. She is mentioned to have died in the period between Diriliş: Ertuğrul and Kuruluş: Osman. Based on Hayme Hatun.

Aliases:
Hayme Ana

Gündoğdu Bey

Gündoğdu Bey (Season 1–2 starring, Season 5 supporting) portrayed by Kaan Taşaner is the eldest son of Süleyman Şah and step-son of Hayme Hatun. Gündoğdu is also the elder half-brother of Ertuğrul, Dündar and Sungurtekin, and the elder adoptive brother of Gökçe. He is the father of Süleyman Alp and İltekin, and the husband of Selcan. Gündoğdu is a somewhat cowardly but well-intentioned character who normally doesn't see through the plans of traitors. He mostly disagrees with Ertuğrul, and he chose to stay on the side that was safer rather than the side which would fight when the tribe split, only wanting the best for his tribe. He became jealous of Ertuğrul in the first two seasons and even had the idea of marrying Goncagül, the devious daughter of Gümüştekin. He also became the Bey of his own Kayı tribe when the tribe had split. Later, when he returned in season 5 after Albastı had destroyed their camp, he worked alongside his brother and he thought more rationally. He is later mentioned in Kuruluş: Osman, said to be martyred by Mongols. Based on Gündoğdu Bey.

Selcan Hatun

Selcan Hatun (Season 1–2 starring, Season 5 supporting) portrayed by Didem Balçın is the daughter of Alptekin Bey and the adoptive daughter of Süleyman Şah and Hayme Hatun. She is the wife of Gündoğdu, elder sister of Gökçe, who she loves dearly, and the mother of Süleyman Alp and İltekin Bey. She is the adoptive sister and sister-in-law of Ertuğrul, Sungurtekin and Dündar. She was initially evil, supporting anyone against Süleyman Şah as he killed her father for treachery, but later repented with the help of İbn-i Arabi. She has a knack of sensing evil intentions and her character developed even further when she stood up against the evil Aytolun Hatun. Her husband thought she was still evil, but seeing the truth, she found a way to show him the truth too and defeat her husband's devious lover, Goncagül. When she returns in season 5, she is devastated upon the martyrdom of her son, Süleyman Alp, and has tense relations with Hafsa Hatun. She returns in the sequel, Kuruluş: Osman, where she becomes a mother figure to Gündüz and Osman. Loosely based on Princess Saljan, a character from the Book of Dede Korkut.

Emir Sadettin Köpek
Emir Sadettin is an important Selçuk court administrator and one of the viziers of Sultan Alaeddin Keykubat. He is also the de facto deputy head of the Selçuk state. He was the adoptive father of Günalp Bey, before Ertuğrul convinced Günalp of Köpek's wrongdoings. A consistent adversary of Ertuğrul, his only motive is to seize complete power and control over the sultanate for himself and to become the Sultan. Köpek even poisons and kills Sultan Alaeddin for this objective. He manipulates and abuses his state authority for his personal aims. He was in love with Aslıhan Hatun and was furious when she married Turgut Bey. He ends up killing her but is later beheaded by Ertuğrul, with the help of Hüsamettin Karaca. Based on Sa'd al-Din Köpek.

Aliases:
Ebu Nakkaş
Emir Sadettin
Sultan Sadettin (self-proclaimed)

İlbilge Hatun
İlbilge Hatun (Season 5) portrayed by Hande Soral is the daughter of Umur Bey of the Umuroğlu and sister of Beybolat Bey and Sırma Hatun. She is the second wife of Ertuğrul Bey and the stepmother of his children. She is a brave Hatun, skilled in swordsmanship, loyal to her father and the state, and always seeking justice. Her intense emotions have sometimes led her to act irrationally. She is deeply in love with Ertuğrul, but tries to hide her feelings. İlbilge would side with Ertuğrul while her brother and sister would ally with the Mongols. She becomes the Hanım of the Umuroğlu, and later marries Ertuğrul. With İlbilge taking Halime Hatun's role in the series, TRT 1 coordinator Kurtuluş Zaman said Ertuğrul "fall[s] in love with the sister of his worst enemy", adding her love with Ertuğrul was "as if [it was] the first season".
She isn't mentioned or shown in Kuruluş: Osman. Loosely based on El Bilga Khatun.

Doğan Alp

Doğan Alp (Season 1–3) portrayed by Cavit Çetin Güner is the adoptive brother of Ertuğrul and blood-brother of Turgut Alp and Bamsı Beyrek. He is one of the three main alps of Ertuğrul along with his blood brothers. Doğan is also the adoptive son of Süleyman Şah and Hayme Hatun, husband of Banu Çiçek Hatun and posthumous father of Doğan Alp Jr. He is smaller in stature than his counterparts, but has a sharp wit, plays a major role in the conquest of Karacahisar even though he was martyred before the conquest. He is later martyred by Ural and Vasilius. He is mentioned again in Kuruluş: Osman.

Süleyman Şah

Süleyman Şah (Season 1) portrayed by Serdar Gökhan starring season 1, guest seasons 2 and 5) is the father of Ertuğrul, Gündoğdu, Sungurtekin and Dündar. Adoptive father of Selcan Hatun, Gökçe Hatun, Turgut Bey, Doğan Alp and Bamsi Beyrek. The husband of Hayme Hatun and long-serving Bey of Kayı tribe. Is mentioned to have had two other sons, killed by Mongols. He only appears in Osman Bey, Hayme Hatun and Ertuğrul's dreams after season 1 where he died in the last episode. He also cameos in a dream sequence in Kuruluş: Osman, and is frequently mentioned. Based on Suleyman Shah.

Komutan Titus

He seeks vengeance against Ertuğrul for killing his brother, Bisol, when saving Halime and her family. Initially, he is loyal to Petruccio Manzini, but later betray him in order to become the "Üstad-ı Azam" of the Templar Castle. He escapes the siege of the castle but is later caught and beheaded by Gündoğdu. He is mentioned in the third season as a motive for Simon's revenge against Ertuğrul.

Aliases:
Ebu Hişam (Disguised)

Kurdoğlu Bey
He took a dark turn after his wife and children were martyred by Mongols, bearing a deep hatred for his blood brother due to his waging of wars. He secretly plots with the Templars to make himself the Bey of the Kayı tribe, and initially succeeds by force, but fails to kill Ertuğrul and Süleyman Şah and is thus overthrown and beheaded by Ertuğrul.

Baycu Noyan

Baycu Noyan (Season 2 starring, Season 4 supporting) portrayed by Barış Bağcı is a Mongol noyan, appointed by Ögedei Han to expand Mongol power in Anatolia, he is also Alangoya's older brother. He gives the Kayı and Dodurga tribes a tough time in season 2, killing Tuğtekin and Gökçe, and when defeated by Ertuğrul, he is thought to be dead. However, he returns in season 4, seeking revenge on Ertuğrul for what he did, also wanting to deliver a peace treaty between the Mongols and Selçuks. The peace treaty progresses well but is broken when Ögedei dies the same day Ertuğrul came to meet him and thus, Noyan, believing Ertuğrul brought a curse, ventures to take his life. In the final season, it is mentioned that he was betrayed by the convert Mergen and killed by Hulagu Han. He is mentioned in Kuruluş: Osman as the father of Kara Şaman Togay. Based on Baiju Noyan.

Aliases:
 Tüccar Abdullah

Tuğtekin Bey
Tuğtekin Bey (Season 2) portrayed by Uğur Güneş is the son of Korkut Bey and Duru Hatun, step-son of Aytolun Hatun, husband of Gökçe Hatun and maternal cousin of Ertuğrul. He was the Chief Alp and later Bey of the Dodurga tribe after his father's death. He is a very hot tempered person, who often cannot control his anger. Originally, he was against Ertuğrul, opposing his actions and allying with Gündoğdu, but after Ertuğrul saves him and reveals that Aytolun murdered his parents, he joins him in favour of migration. However, he is martyred by Noyan along with his wife. Loosely based on Toghtekin, a Turkic commander.

Notes:

Ural Bey

The husband of Çolpan Hatun. Ural is very ambitious, seeking more and more power, he soon finds himself knocking on the doors of Komutan Vasilius. To achieve his goals, he constantly aims to kill Aliyar and Ertuğrul, but is eventually beheaded by Ertuğrul in his attempt to become the Çavdar Bey.

Tekfur Vasilius
He is obsessed with the idea of driving away all Turks from his lands, and plots ceaselessly against Ertuğrul. He is in love with Helena, and is angered when she discovers he killed her father and leaves to live with the Kayı. He is eventually killed by Ertuğrul when trying to ambush Sultan Alaeddin. He is mentioned again in Kuruluş: Osman.

Aliases:
Komutan Vasilius (formerly)

Aliyar Bey
Aliyar Bey (Season 3) portrayed by Cem Uçan is the second son of Candar Bey, younger brother of Ural Bey and elder brother of Aslıhan Hatun. Aliyar later became the Bey of the Çavdar tribe. He is a pious, scholarly and a level headed young man unlike his brother, Ural. He is also a formidable archer as well as a master detective. Forms a strong, unshakable bond of brotherhood with Ertuğrul.  In battles, wields his trademark two-pointed sword & dagger, seemingly inspired by Zulfiqar, the legendary sword of the fourth Caliph, Ali. He is later martyred by Vasilius in an ambush.

Tekfur Ares

Ares (Season 3 guest, Season 4 starring) portrayed by Cemal Hünal is Vasilius successor as the Tekfur of Karacahisar. Is a skilled Byzantine commander and the best friend of Titan. He was initially an enemy of Ertuğrul, setting various traps for him with the help of Sadettin Köpek and Titan, but he later allied with Ertuğrul after accepting Islam when meeting İbn-i Arabi in a dream. When spying for Ertuğrul in Tekfur Kritos of Bilecik's castle, he is eventually caught as a spy and through some events, is martyred by Noyan.

Aliases:
Ahmet Alp (after converting to Islam)
Komutan Ares (formerly)

Sultan Gıyaseddın Keyhüsrev
Sultan Gıyaseddın Keyhüsrev (Season 4) portrayed by Burak Dakak is the son of Sultan Alaeddin and Mahperi Hatun, older half-brother of Kiliçarslan and stepson of Melike Hatun. Is calm and level-headed, and does not get involved in his mother's plans, although he does override his father's will for Kiliçarslan to succeed him by becoming Sultan. Is devastated when his father dies, but decides not to expose his mother for her involvement. Later allies with Ertuğrul against Köpek's attempt to seize the throne. Is likely to have died offscreen after season 4, as Sultan İzzedin Kaykavus had taken the position of Sultan, as a vassal of the Mongols, in season 5. He is mentioned again in Kuruluş: Osman. Based on Kaykhusraw II.

Aliases:
Şehzade Gıyaseddın (before becoming Sultan)

Notes:

Komutan Dragos

Dragos (Season 5) portrayed by İlker Aksum is one of the most respected commanders of Byzantium. However, he betrayed and made his own secret organization, planning to take over Söğüt from Ertuğrul. Is disguised as the Söğüt church's bell-ringer and gives the task of "being" Dragos to his right-hand man Uranos (Uğur Karabulut), a disgraced Byzantine commander. Uranos is later beheaded by Ertuğrul in Söğüt. Dragos plots many times against Ertuğrul but Ertuğrul foils his traps and plans and he is caught and finally beheaded by Ertuğrul in Söğüt.

Aliases:
Söğüt Zangoç

Beybolat Bey

Beybolat Bey (Season 5) portrayed by Ali Ersan Duru is the son of Umur Bey and Bey of the Umuroğlu after his father's death. He is the elder brother of İlbilge Hatun and Sırma Hatun. Unbeknownst to Ertuğrul, he is a Selçuk assassin that works with the Mongols to wipe out rebelling Oğuz tribes, under a fake name, 'Albastı'. Beybolat vows to kill Ertuğrul and his brothers, and wipe out the Kayı tribe in order to become the Uç Bey. Also very aggressive, bloodthirsty and overconfident in his abilities to trap Ertuğrul and when he fails, his hidden truth is revealed. Beybolat is also very brave as he escapes Ertuğrul's clutches after jumping off a high cliff into a river. When he survives the jump, he teams up with Arikbuka to destroy Ertuğrul and the Kayı once and for all. He is finally killed by Ertuğrul when he had Ertuğrul in his own hands and thus leaves Sırma with a thirst for revenge.

Aliases:
Albastı

Supporting characters

Deli Demir
Deli Demir is the father of Aykız Hatun and the adoptive father of Turalı Alp. He is treated by Turgut as his own father. The much-loved blacksmith of Kayı tribe, Demir has a strong, fearless personality. A loyal ally of Süleyman Şah and Ertuğrul, he is devastated when Aykız is killed. It is believed that he also had two sons, who were also killed by the Mongols. He is martyred by Tangut in season 2. A similar character, 'Demirci Davud', appears in the sequel, Kuruluş: Osman.

Aliases:

Demir Üsta

Hafsa Hatun

Hafsa Hatun is the daughter of Tekfur Andros; she marries Bamsı Beyrek, and has a son named Aybars and a daughter named Aslıhan. She is pressured to marry Vasilius while she is in love with Bamsı, before it is proved to her that Vasilius is her father's killer. Raised a Christian (and named "Helena"), she accepts Islam and changes her name to Hafsa. She is great friends with other Hatuns of the Kayı like Halime, Aslıhan, Banu Çiçek and İlbilge. During her pregnancy she becomes very ill and travels to Konya for her treatment and gives birth to her daughter offscreen. She takes on a leadership role among the Kayıs after Halime Sultan's death. In season 5, she has tense relations with Selcan but remains patient. Between Dirilliş: Ertuğrul and Kuruluş: Osman, she and her daughter die in a plague.

Aslıhan Hatun

Aslıhan Hatun (Gülsim Ali) is the daughter of Candar Bey, the youngest sister of Ural and Aliyar and the second wife of Turgut Bey. She acted as the Hanım of the Çavdar tribe during her father and brother's rule. She is a brave Hatun, who originally had tensions with Halime due to her love for Ertuğrul, and was misled by Ural into siding with him, but later supports Aliyar and Ertuğrul after being shown the truth about Ural. After Aliyar's death, she becomes the leader of her tribe, facing many difficulties including the arrival of Bahadır. She is later martyred by Sadettin Köpek, who had been in love with her, when she attempted to kill him.

Gülsim Ali, who plays the role of Aslıhan, signed a contract to work with Pakistani actress Ayeza Khan for Pakistani designer Maria B's summer collection following her popularity from Diriliş: Ertuğrul.

İbn-i Arabi 

İbn-i Arabi (Ozman Sirgood) is a famous Arab Andalusian Sufi mystic and scholar, and is the mentor of Ertuğrul. The spiritual leader of the Muslim world, he provides support to Ertuğrul and his companions, giving Ertuğrul several holy relics and earning the ire of enemies, particularly the Templars and Sadettin Köpek. Arabi does not appear in season 5 due to his offscreen death, although his voice can be heard in the last scene of the series when Ertuğrul and his alps head off to war. He is also mentioned in Kuruluş: Osman. Based on Ibn Arabi.

Aliases:
 Arabi

Artuk Bey

Artuk Bey (Ayberk Pekcan), a respected bey of the tribe, is an experienced physician. He joined Ertuğrul and the Kayı tribe in the journey to the Western borders of the Sultanate of Rum and became Ertuğrul's right-hand man in administering the Hanlı Pazar and Karacahisar Castle. He marries Marya on Ertuğrul's request, before Marya is caught as a traitor by Artuk Bey himself. Artuk Bey is very loyal to Ertuğrul and his cause and he teaches his son, Savcı, physics and how to deal with medicines. He is often regarded as the second in command of the tribe and the closest to him knowing all his secrets. He is permanently blinded by Batur Alp when Beybolat and Emir Bahattin were searching for the chest but still knew what was going on around him. When blinded he would receive help from İlçin Hatun. He is mostly described as the 'main supporting character' of the series. He is not mentioned or shown in Kuruluş: Osman, and is therefore assumed to have died offscreen. Loosely based on Artuk Bey.

Dündar Bey

Dündar Bey (Arda Anarat, seasons 1–2; Batuhan Karacakaya, seasons 3–4) is the youngest son of Süleyman Şah and Hayme, the younger half-brother of Gündoğdu and the younger brother of Ertuğrul and Sungurtekin, as well as Selcan's adoptive brother. Is loving and loyal towards Ertuğrul, and is the only one of his biological brothers to support him when the tribe split, although is naive and easily manipulated by others. He indirectly causes Doğan's death by accidentally revealing important information to Ural's allies. Is exiled to Gündoğdu's tribe by Ertuğrul for attempting to sell Hanlı Pazar and leave the Selçuk-Byzantine border. Returns as an older man, portrayed by Ragıp Savaş, in Kuruluş: Osman. Based on Dündar Bey.

Abdurrahman Alp

Abdurrahman Alp (Celal Al) is Süleyman Şah and Hayme's bodyguard and later Ertuğrul's loyal alp. Is falsely accused by the Dodurgas of treachery and is nearly executed, but is saved by Ertuğrul and becomes his spy in Noyan's army under the guise of being a traitor. Later migrates with Ertuğrul to the western borders and becomes one of his senior alps. He briefly becomes Chief Alp, replacing Bamsı Beyrek, in season 5. He returns in the sequel, Kuruluş: Osman. Based on Abdurrahman Gazi.

Aliases:
 Abdurrahman Alpbaşı
 Rahman

Banu Çiçek

Banu Çiçek Hatun (Ezgi Esma Kürklu) is the wife of Doğan Alp, adoptive daughter of Korkut Bey and Duru Hatun and adoptive sister of Tuğtekin Bey. Falls in love with Doğan after he rescues her from imprisonment by Gümüştekin after she is framed for poisoning Korkut Bey. Later becomes the personal assistant and bodyguard of Halime Sultan. Is devastated by her husband's death. Has a son named Doğan. She and her son are not shown or mentioned after season 3. Loosely based on Banu Chichek, a character in the Book of Dede Korkut, whose story was referenced by Bamsı Beyrek in season 3.

Sungurtekin Bey

Sungurtekin Bey or Sungur Tekin Bey is the second son of Süleyman Şah and the oldest biological son of Hayme Hatun. He is Gündoğdu's half brother, and the older brother of Ertuğrul and Dündar. He disappeared for years after being captured by Noyan; everyone thought he was dead, but he was actually a spy for the Sultan in Ögedei's army. He returns to the tribe after the Mongols find out he was spying on them. Sungurtekin sides with his older brother, Gündoğdu, and does not migrate with Ertuğrul, but later joins him to kill Emir Sadettin Köpek and again with Gündoğdu to escape the Mongols and Albastı. He returns briefly in Kuruluş: Osman. Based on Sungurtekin Bey.

Gökçe Hatun

Gökçe Hatun (Burcu Kıratlı) is the youngest daughter of Alptekin Bey, the younger sister of Selcan and the wife of Tuğtekin Bey. Adoptive daughter of Süleyman Şah and Hayme Hatun, the adoptive sister of Ertuğrul, Gündoğdu, Sungurtekin and Dündar. Hanım of the Dodurga tribe through her marriage to Tuğtekin. She was in love with Ertuğrul throughout her childhood, thus becoming jealous of Halime upon her arrival at the tribe and after her marriage with Ertuğrul. Has tense relations with her sister before making up, and grew to love her husband. Is eventually martyred by Noyan along with Tuğtekin.

Others
This is a list of characters who have been supporting characters in one season only, and may have made minor or guest appearances in other seasons:

Season 1
Hande Subaşı as Aykız Hatun - The daughter of Deli Demir and the childhood lover and first wife of Turgut Alp. One of the bravest of the Kayı Hatuns, she was the first woman to support Halime Hatun upon her much-contested arrival at the tribe. Took good care of Turgut while he recuperated from his brainwashing. Is extremely talented with a bow. Is martyred after being seriously burned by Mongols whilst pregnant at the beginning of season 2.
 as Petruccio Manzini - The Üstad-ı Azam of Templar Castle, he was sent by the Pope to take over Jerusalem. He minded his own business but got involved with the Kayı  after Ertuğrul saved Halime Hatun and her family. Kardinal Thomas worked tirelessly against him without him even knowing and thus died with a poisonous dagger jabbed into him through his niece, İzadora and then finally beheaded by Turgut, who he mercilessly poisened when captured.
Reshad Strik as Claudius/ Ömer Alp - A Templar assassin sent by Kardinal Thomas to kill İbn-i Arabi. However, after confronting Arabi and Ertuğrul, he becomes a Muslim. He is sent as Ertuğrul's spy in the Templars’ castle and plays a key role in the Kayıs’ conquest of the castle. He is martyred by Titus when he discovers he is a spy.
Mehmet İncı as Emir El Aziz - The Ayyubid Emir of Aleppo. He is the older brother of Leyla Sultan, and the grandson of Selahuddin Eyyubi. He is manipulated by the Templars into oppressing the Kayıs, before Ertuğrul uncovers the truth for him. He implied his own impending death at the end of season 1, and does not reappear. Based on Al-Aziz Muhammad.

Season 2
 as Aytolun Hatun - The second wife of Korkut Bey and the stepmother of Tuğtekin Bey. She murdered Duru Hatun (offscreen) in order to marry Korkut as part of her plan to make her brother, Gümüştekin, the margrave of the Turkmen tribes. Aytolun constantly argues with Selcan and succeeds in making everyone think she's still evil, including her husband. However, Aytolun's truth is eventually revealed, and later on, is killed by Abdurrahman Alp when she attempted to kill Halime.
 as Gümüştekin Bey - Older brother of Aytolun and father of Goncagül Hatun. A close friend of Sadettin Köpek, he seeks to become the Uç Bey, or margrave, of the Turkmen tribes in the region of Erzurum. Seeks to marry his daughter to Gündoğdu to further his plans. He is eventually caught by Ertuğrul, Sungurtekin and Tuğtekin with the help of Selcan and Banu Çiçek for having Korkut Bey poisoned. Is beheaded by Ertuğrul. Based on Gazi Gümüshtigin.
Zeynep Kızıltan as Goncagül Hatun - Daughter of Gümüştekin, niece of Aytolun. She Falls in love with Gündoğdu and nearly marries him to further her father's goals, although the plan is stopped by Hayme and Ertuğrul. Has tense relationships with Selcan. After her truth is revealed, she eventually escapes and falls in love with Noyan, leading to her collaborating with Sadettin Köpek and Noyan, wanting to get revenge on her Father and Aunt. Is killed by Gökçe.
Hüseyin Özay as Korkut Bey - Older brother of Hayme, father of Tuğtekin, adoptive father of Banu Çiçek and uncle of Ertuğrul. Widower of Duru Hatun and husband of Aytolun. Bey of the Dodurga tribe, he admires his nephew Ertuğrul and struggles to pick sides between him and his son Tuğtekin. Is mentioned to have had two other sons, both martyred by Mongols. He is manipulated by his wife Aytolun and is eventually poisoned to death by her
.

Season 3
Lebip Gökhan as Hancı Simon - The brother of Maria, a poison expert and doctor, and the local master of the public market (Hanlı Pazar), disguised as a Byzantine but actually is a Templar wanting to kill Ertuğrul for what he did to Petruccio Manzini and Titus. He works under the Templar alias 'Vaftizci Yahya'. Ural kills him to cover up his tracks.

Erden Alkan as Candar Bey - The Bey of the Çavdar tribe. Candar is the father of Aliyar Bey, Ural Bey, and Aslıhan Hatun, and the older brother of Bahadır Bey. Initially supports Ertuğrul for his own benefit but then turns against him after Ertuğrul refuses to marry Aslıhan. He dies while trying to save Ural from being beheaded at Hanlı Pazar. Loosely based on Yaman Candar.
Gülçin Santırcıoğlu as Çolpan Hatun/ Ekaterina - Ural's devious wife and the daughter of a former Byzantine Tekfur who was killed by Helena's father and Vasilius. She acts as if she had converted to Islam after marrying Ural but is actually still a Christian. She seeks to kill Vasilius to avenge her father. After she becomes pregnant, once Ural was dead, she is killed in Nicea in mysterious circumstances, only mentioned by Sadettin Köpek.

Season 4
Sinem Öztürk as Mahperi Hatun - The wife of Sultan Alaeddin and mother of Gıyaseddın. She is of Greek origin and is a Tekfur's daughter. Mahperi seeks to make her son Sultan in order to increase her influence in the Selçuk palace, and even collaborates with Köpek and has the Sultan killed for this cause. She has an intense dislike for the Sultan's other wife, Melike Hatun, and her son, Kiliçarslan. She later begs for forgiveness and repents. She presumably died offscreen before season 5.
Ertuğrul Postoğlu as Bahadır Bey - Younger brother of Candar Bey, father of Sancar and husband of Karaca Hatun. Is similar in character to his nephew, Ural. Bey of his own branch of the Çavdar tribe, he is a veteran of wars in the east, and seeks to become the Bey of both Çavdar tribes, causing problems for Aslıhan and Turgut. After he overthrows and imprisons Aslıhan, he is beheaded by Ertuğrul. Not to be confused with Kuruluş: Osman's Bahadır Bey.
 as Titan - A Byzantine commander and best friend of Ares. Kidnaps Gündüz and spies in Kayı tribe under the name ‘Darius’. Later kills Samsa Alp, and allies with Komutan Angelos and receives letters from Marya after her marriage to Artuk Bey. Is killed by Turgut Bey. A similar character, 'Komutan Flatyos', appears in Kuruluş: Osman.
Engin Öztürk as Kaledar Günalp Bey - Son of Tayı Bey and adoptive son of Sadettin Köpek. A "Kaledar" (castle commander) of the Selçuks, he occupies Karacahisar and is initially hostile to Ertuğrul, having a wish to serve the state in the same manner as his father. However, it is later revealed that his family was murdered by Köpek, causing him to ally with Ertuğrul. Is given sovereignty over Karacahisar as an Uç Bey through a Selçuk decree and with Ertuğrul's consent. Is not shown or mentioned after season 4.
Burak Hakkı as Sultan Alaeddin Keykubat - The Sultan of the Selçuk Sultanate of Rum. He is the father of Şehzade Gıyaseddin (who later becomes Sultan) and Şehzade İzzettin Kılıçarslan, the husband of Mahperi Hatun and Melike Hatun and the brother of Şehzade Numan and Şehzade İzzetin, both of whom he disputed the throne with. He is highly respected among the Turkmen tribes, making Ertuğrul an Uç Bey, but is manipulated by Emir Sadettin and eventually killed after being poisoned indirectly through him. He is mentioned again in Kuruluş: Osman. Based on Kayqubad I.

Season 5
Engin Benli as Komutan Alıncak - A Mongol commander known for his cruelty and assistance for Albastı against Gündoğdu's tribe. He carries around a whip, using it to severely wound Mergen who uses that whip to take revenge on him. He is constantly humiliated in front of Hulagu by Ertuğrul as he unknowingly falls into nearly all of Ertuğrul's traps. He is usually laughing and is the blood brother of Arikbuka. Alıncak is eventually killed by Ertuğrul when he and Dragos attempted to kill Bamsı and Aybars. Based on Alinjak, a Mongol commander of Ilkhanate and Hulagu Khan's general.
Emre Üçtepe as Osman Bey - The third and youngest son of Ertuğrul and Halime. Younger brother of Gündüz Alp and Savcı Bey. He has dreams of his grandfather Süleyman Şah and aspires to hold the honour of the Kayı tribe. His father tries to rein him in, but he has a clear vision and is hard to control. Features in various prophetic dreams of Ertuğrul, Hayme and Halime before his birth. Is taught by the Imam of Söğüt. He also features as the main protagonist in the sequel, Kuruluş: Osman, portrayed by Burak Özçivit. Based on Osman I, the founder of the Ottoman Empire. 

Yaman Tümen (seasons 3–4) and Arif Diren (season 5) as Gündüz Alp (also known as Gündüz Bey) - The eldest son of Ertuğrul and Halime, the older brother of Savcı and Osman. A brave child growing up, blinding Tekfur Ares in one eye when he was kidnapped, he aspires to be like his father and is protective of his younger brothers. Gündüz is the best friend of Çağrı, a boy who lives in Söğüt and thus is suggested not to be a Kayı. He becomes slightly brash as he grows up, making various errors. He falls in love with Prenses İrene (Rümeysa Arslan), the daughter of Tekfur Yannis of Lefke Castle, who later leaves when she seeks to find her father's killer when he is killed by Komutan Dragos. She is not shown or mentioned in Kuruluş: Osman. Based on Gündüz Alp, the son of Ertuğrul.

Öykü Çelik as Sırma Hatun - The youngest daughter of Umur Bey and the younger sister of Beybolat and İlbilge. Is vengeful, cold, bossy and calculated, and is loyal to her brother, bearing a hatred for her older sister, even deciding to marry Taskun Bey for her own benefit and revenge against her sister after Beybolat's death. She is killed by a poisoned İlbilge.
Ali Bühara Mete as Mergen (disguised as Eynece) - A Mongol warrior who serves Baycu Noyan and Alangoya, pretending to be Alangoya's brother and a master hunter under the name 'Eynece'. Later becomes a Muslim and serves Ertuğrul Bey. He indirectly causes Noyan's death at the hands of Hulagu Han. He later becomes Ertuğrul's spy on the Mongols along with Turgut. He is martyred, along with Dumrul Alp, in Arıkbuka's ambush.

Minor characters

Multiple seasons 
Melih Özdoğan as Samsa Alp - Loyal alp of Tuğtekin and later Ertuğrul. Is the most noble and righteous of Tuğtekin's alps. Later migrates to the west with Ertuğrul and becomes good friends with Dumrul, Günküt and Bamsı and is loyal to Turgut as his Chief Alp. Is martyred by Titan whilst trying to protect the Kayıs’ catapults in season 4. Not to be confused with Kuruluş: Osman's Samsa Çavuş, although they are both based on the same historical figure.
Edip Zeydan as Dumrul Alp - A Kayı alp and later an alp of Ertuğrul. Hayme Hatun's bodyguard in season 2. Migrates to the western border and becomes good friends with Günküt,Bamsı and Samsa. Later becomes Ertuğrul's spy, under the name ‘Polin’, in Karacahisar along with Haçaturyan Usta. Is martyred in a Mongol ambush in season 5. Not to be confused with Kuruluş: Osman's Dumrul Alp. Loosely based on Deli Dumrul, a character from the Book of Dede Korkut, whose story was referenced by Bamsı Beyrek in season 3.
Hakan Serim as Günkut Alp - A Kayı alp and later an alp of Ertuğrul. Refuses to support Hamza in defecting to Noyan in season 2. Migrates to the western border and becomes good friends with Dumrul and Bamsı. He likes to joke around, particularly with Bamsı. Appears throughout the series, but is not shown or mentioned in Kuruluş: Osman.
Melikşah Özen as Melikşah Alp - One of Ertuğrul's alps. Migrates with Ertuğrul to the western border. Is mostly seen with Dumrul, Günküt and Bamsı. Appears throughout the series, but is not shown or mentioned in Kuruluş: Osman.
Tolga Sala as Hamza Alp - Gündoğdu Bey's alp. Is captured by Kara Toygar along with Gündoğdu in season 1. In season 2, after being falsely accused of treachery by Gündoğdu and Tuğtekin, he is angered and defects to Noyan's army. He is later captured by Gündoğdu with the help of Abdurrahman, although he repents and helps Gündoğdu capture Noyan. Is martyred by Noyan when fighting against him.
Arda Öziri as Göktug - A Seljuk soldier and Sadettin Köpek's right-hand man. He serves him in all of his wrong-doings including poisoning Turgut and Aslihan. He treats Köpek's as his father. Is killed by Ertuğrul when he tried to kill Ares. Not to be confused by ' 'Kurulus: Osman' ' Göktuğ Alpbaşı.
Gökhan Karacık as Derviş İshak - A Derviş and İbn-i Arabi's most trusted and loyal companion. He stays with the Kayı tribe on İbn-i Arabi's orders from season 2. He later becomes a doctor along with Artuk Bey and a teacher to children. He is martyred in Ares's ambush.

Season 1 
Büşra Çubukçuoğlu as Leyla Sultan - El Aziz's younger sister. Falls in love with Ertuğrul after he saves her uncle Şahabettin but later back off after she realises Ertuğrul love for Halime. 
Hamit Demir as Akçakoça Bey - The Kayı doctor in season one and one of Süleyman Şah's friends. He disappeared after collecting some herbs, the truth being that the actor was fired from the show for taking part in a video commemorating a Gezi victim.
 as Şehzade Numan - Father of Halime and Yiğit, younger brother of Sultan Alaeddin. An exiled Selçuk prince who is persecuted by Kara Toygar and the Templars, he later allies with El Aziz to overthrow his brother and become the Sultan. He is killed for this by Afşin Bey on Kara Toygar's orders.
Burak Temiz as Şehzade Yiğit (also known as Yiğit Alp) - Younger brother of Halime, the son of Şehzade Numan and the nephew of Sultan Alaeddin. Best friend and blood brother of Dündar. Spent many years in exile with his father and sister, before integrating into Kayı tribe. Is captured first by the Templars and later by Noyan, both times along with Turgut Alp, forming a strong bond with him. After foiling a plan by Sadettin Köpek and Baycu Noyan to overthrow Sultan Alaeddin, he is martyred in Köpek's ambush, devastating his sister.
Burak Çimen as Nâsır - A Templar spy and El Aziz's right-hand man and commander. Frequently attempts to force the Kayıs out of Ayyubid lands and conspires against vizier Şahabettın Tuğrul and Ertuğrul. Is killed by Ertuğrul after being caught.
 as Afşin Bey - A loyal agent and commander of the Selçuk State, who works together with the Kayıs, helping them defeat Kara Toygar and the Templars, although later allies with Kara Toygar and kills Şehzade Numan, angering Ertuğrul. Is mentioned to have committed suicide out of guilt in Konya. Loosely based on Afshin Bey.
 as Kara Toygar - A powerful, tyrannical Selçuk commander. Seeks to capture Numan, Yiğit and Halime to increase his political influence, and works together with the Templars. Is captured by the Kayıs, although is later freed by Titus. Later allies with Afşin Bey and has Numan murdered. Is said to have been killed in unknown circumstances, only mentioned by Titus.
Dilek Serbest as  - The daughter of Ömer and sister of Elenora, Petruccio's niece. Is saddened by her sister's death, prompting her to protect Yiğit. When she learns the truth about her father, she meets him and helps Ertuğrul and the Kayıs. When she is caught she stabs Petruccio with a poisonous dagger given to her by Kardinal Thomas. She is then hanged in the prison.
Aysegül Issever as Dadi Ümmülhayr - The aunt and motherlike figure to Emir Al-Aziz and Leyla Sultan. She is the incharge of many of the castle duties. She is also a good doctor and takes care of Halime in the castle when she was shot by an arrow. She shares a strong bond with Leyla and takes deep care for her. She is sent to prison for helping Ertuğrul but is removed when Al-Aziz learns his mistake.
Erol Tasci as Mario - Petruccio's right hand-men. Is often seen delivering messages to Petruccio sent by the pigeons. He later  tells the truth about Ömer to Izadora because he couldn't hide the secret more longer and later suicides to cover his tracks.
Iskender Altin as Ömer - The father of Izadora and Elenora and the brother of Petruccio. He accepts Islam from Ibni Arabi which made his brother angry and faked his death by prisoning him. He secretly helps Ertuğrul and the Kayis through Izadora.
Zeynep Aydemir as Eftalya - A Templar spy in Aleppo, disguised as El-Aziz's servant and love interest under the fake name 'Esma'. She frames vizier Şahabettın for a poisoning. She is thought to be dead when she burns herself, but it is later revealed that she had burned another woman and continues plots against the Seljuks and Ayyubids with the Templars. She is not shown or mentioned after season 1.
Özlem Aydin as Elenora - The younger sister of Izadora and daughter of Ömer, Petruccio's niece. Titus's love and interest. She is killed by Petruccio's men when she finds the truth about her father leaving her sister devastated.

Season 2 

Bogaçhan Talha Peker as Turalı Alp - An young boy, orphaned after his parents are killed by Mongols. Later adopted by Deli Demir, and is devastated upon his death, being put in Artuk Bey's care. Forms a close relationship with Turgut as they share loss. Not shown or mentioned after season 2. Not to be confused with Kuruluş: Osman's Kanturali Alp.
Çaglar Yigitogullari as Ulu Bilge Saman - A Saman of Noyan and a very close and faithful companion to him. He remains on Noyan's side when Tangut took control of Noyan's soldiers. He has the ability to talk to 'spirits'. Is killed by Turgut in.
Atilla Kiliç as Bogaç Alp - He was a loyal alp of Tuğtekin but later becomes a traitor due to Gümüştekin's death. After Gümüştekin was killed, he helps Emir Sadettin Köpek and Noyan. He had a major role in the martyrdom of Tuğtekin, Gökçe and Yiğit. Is killed by Turgut when tried to kill Ertuğrul and Gündüz.
Muharrem Özcan as Tangut - Noyan's most trusted soldier, is eager to kill Ertuğrul after he escaped the first time they captured him. Later on, he turns against Noyan, seeking to become the commander of Ögedei's army. Is killed by Sungurtekin
Kaptan Gürman as Geyikli - A man who lives in forest in a cave. Saves Ertuğrul and heals him. Later his cave becomes shelter for Ertuğrul and his alps, an injured Tuğtekin and Yiğit. Is seen migrating with Ertuğrul's tribe but is not shown or mentioned after season 2.
Evren Erler as Kocabaş Alp - Tuğtekin's alp who secretly serves Noyan. He has tough relations with the Kayı alps especially Doğan Alp. He is eventually beheaded by Ertuğrul when he falsely accused him for killing Tuğtekin.

Season 3 

Renan Karagözoğlu as Acar Bey - Father of Günyelı Hatun and Ural's closest ally. A greedy Çavdar Bey, he always sides with Ural, causing problems for Aliyar. He uses his daughter to manipulate Dündar into revealing important information, leading to Doğan Alp's death. Is killed by Ertuğrul at the Kayı camp.
Nazlı Yanılmaz as Günyelı Hatun - Daughter of Acar Bey. Pretends to fall in love with Dündar, manipulating him into revealing information and serving her father. Tricks Dündar into causing Doğan's death. Is killed by Dündar at the Kayı camp.
Mehmet Pala as Kutluca Alp - Candar Bey's bodyguard and later Aliyar Bey's alp. Is loyal to Ertuğrul and Aliyar. Becomes the Alpbaşı of Çavdar tribe after Aliyar becomes the Bey. Is martyred by Ural during his coup.
Gökhan Bekletenler as Haçaturyan Usta - An Armenian former goldsmith and slave. Is saved from Ural's barbarity by Ertuğrul. He spies in Karacahisar as Ertuğrul's spy under the name 'Alvin', along with Dumrul. He is killed by Ural after his spying is revealed.
Osman Albayrak as Batuhan Alp - Ural Bey's main alp and the lover of Aslihan Hatun. He helps Ural in his plans in exchange for getting Aslihan as his bride. He is blamed for Ural's misdeeds when Ural gets caught. Is shocked to know that Ural and Candar Bey are giving Aslihan's hand to Emir Sadettin Köpek and thus kidnaps her. Is killed by Ertuğrul when he tried to kill Aliyar.
Sedef Sahin as Maria - Simon's younger sister and an expert in the field of poisons. She fell for Turgut when she first saw him and took him to inn when he was sick and took good care for him. She prepared poisons to kill Toktamis Bey and Ertuğrul. She is killed by her own poisonous dagger by Turgut, when she attempted to kill him.
Elif Sümbül Sert as Amanda - A seller of perfumes in the Hanli Bazar. She is Ural's love and promises her to marry him if she helps him in his deeds after taking over Hanli Bazar. She is caught by her friend Maria and sent to Ertuğrul for hiring men to capture Halime and Aslihan and injure Gündüz. Is killed by Ural to cover his tracks when she is freed.
Firat Topkorur as Petrus - A loyal servant of Simon and later Vasilius. Is disguised as a Muslim merchant in the Hanali Bazar to spy on traders like Ertuğrul and Ural for Simon, under the fake name 'Tüccar Hasan'. After the conquest of Hanli Bazar, he flees to Karacahisar Castle to take help from Vasilius. He is killed along with Laskaris.

Season 4 

Hakan Bozyiğit as Komutan Kostas - Ares' commander and later the main commander of Karacahisar. Is possibly the father of Kuruluş: Osmans Flatyos. He has a black cross on his uniform, unlike his fellow Byzantine soldiers and commanders with a red cross. He is killed by Ertuğrul during his conquest of Karacahisar.
Sera Tokdemir as Marya - Ares' lover and later wife of Artuk Bey. Is a former slave-girl who was gifted to Ares by the slave trader Simko, with the purpose of spying on him. Ares later kills Marya's younger brother, devastating her and causing her to side with Ertuğrul, marrying Artuk Bey. However, she later betrays the Kayıs by sending information to Titan and Angelos. After she is caught, she is rescued by Emir Sadettin and is placed as his spy in Bilecik Castle. Is killed by Tekfur Kritos after her spying is revealed.
Levent Sülün as Simko - A slave trader who kidnaps Ertuğrul to use him for his plans for Ares. He gifts Ares a slave called Marya, to spy on him. Is killed by Ares when caught.
Gürbey İleri as Sancar Bey - The son of Bahadır Bey and stepson of Karaca Hatun. He is very fiery, and often cannot control his anger. He hates people who disrespect his father. He has tense relations with Turgut and often fights with him. Is later killed by Ertuğrul.
Aslıhan Güner as Karaca Hatun - Bahadır Bey's wife and Sancar's mother. Is very devious like her husband and supports him in every matter. Has tense relations with Aslıhan and is later killed by her when she attempted to kill Ertuğrul to avenge her husband and son. 
Hakan Onat as Komutan Angelos - Tekfur Kritos son. Is sent to help Titan after the conquest of Karacahisar. He later kidnap's Hafsa and Aslıhan. Is beheaded by Bamsi.
Orhan Kılıç as Atsiz Bey - A Seljuk spy who saves Ertuğrul from Simko. He becomes Ertuğrul's spy in Karacahisar castle, given the task of being the existent merchant 'Tuccar Niko'. Plays a major role in the conquest of Karacahisar. He is later martyred by Ares after he is caught spying on his hideout.

 Season 5 

Halit Özgür Sarı as Süleyman Alp - The son of Gündoğdu Bey and Selcan Hatun and the elder brother of İltekin. He came along with his mother to Ertuğrul's tribes after Albastı's attacks. Süleyman grows a strong friendship with his cousin and Ertuğrul's son, Gündüz Alp, but is killed by Beybolat Bey when Ertuğrul takes back his town for revenge much to his mother's devastation.
Kerem Bekişoğlu as Savcı Bey - The second son of Ertuğrul and Halime, younger brother of Gündüz Alp and older brother of Osman Bey. Shows a keen interest in science, spending time with Artuk Bey. He returns in season 2 of the sequel, Kuruluş: Osman, portrayed by Kanbolat Görkem Arslan. Based on Saru Batu Savcı Bey.

Enes Göçmen as Aybars - The son of Bamsi and Hafsa and younger brother of Aslihan. He also shows an interest in science, making him good friends with Savci. He chooses studies over swords which annoys Bamsi. He and his sister and the sons of Ertuğrul share a close bond. Is kidnapped by Albasti but later saved. Is shown as a grown up in the sequel, Kuruluş: Osman portrayed by Serhan Onat
	Çagla Naz Kargi as Aslihan - The daughter of Bamsi and Hafsa and older sister of Aybars. She and her brother and the sons of Ertuğrul have a close bond. Is named after her paternal late aunt Aslihan Hatun due to Hafsa's great friendship with her. Is mentioned to have died between Dirilliş: Ertuğrul and Kuruluş: Osman in a plague with her mother.
 Rümeysa Arslan as Prenses İrene (transl. Princess Irene) - The daughter of Tekfur Yannis of Lefke Castle and Gündüz's love interest. She secretly meets Gündüz and even makes him hide in the castle. After her father's death, she takes shelter in the Kayi Tribe but later leaves to find her father's killer without telling Gündüz or anyone. 
Armagan Oguz as Ataç Bey - Umur Bey's and later İlbilge Hatun's bodyguard. He is always seen around his Bey. Is killed by Beybolat Bey in Söğüt for not being able to protect his father, Umur Bey.
Şafak Baskaya as Yınal Alp - Beybolat Bey's closet friend and his bodyguard. He is a very good Alp. Is later killed by Bamsi.
Enis Yıldız as Tekfur Yannis - Tekfur of Lefke Castle and Irene's father. He supports Ertuğrul and allies with him to learn who Dragos is. Is later killed by Lais when he identifies that Zangoç is Dragos.
Aytek Sayan as Komutan Lais - The commander of Lefke Castle and Dragos's spy. He kills Tekfur Yannis and learns Irenes secrets through Maria. Eventually his real identity is revealed and is finally beheaded by Ertuğrul in Söğüt.
Hüseyin Gülhuy as Komutan Subutai - Alıncak's bodyguard. He is a very fierce Mongol Commander and raids the Kayı Tribe along with his master. Is killed by Turgut and his head is sent to Alıncak in Söğüt.
Esra Balıkci as Mengü Hatun - İlbilge Hatun's assistant. She is very calm and friendly. She sent messages sent by Ertuğrul to İlbilge Hatun when Alıncak took over the tribe. She appears through the season, mainly near İlbilge Hatun.
 Emre Erçil as Arikbuka - a dangerous and bloodthirsty Mongol spy. Alincak's blood brother, he makes his appearance after Beybolat's identity as "Albasti" is discovered, rescuing him from being captured by Ertugrul's soldiers. Later, he allies himself with Beybolat to obtain the gold of the Kayi, ambushing Ertugrul, where in addition to kidnapping him, they kill Dumrul and Merghe and leave Turgut on the verge of death. After Ertugrul assassinates Beybolat, Arikbuka establishes an alliance with Sirma, Beybolat's sister, influencing the election of the new bey of Umuroğlu, as well as plotting the kidnapping of Behre Khan in order to advance on the Anatolian tribes. However, Ertugrul foils Arikbuka's plans and ends up slitting his throat.

Guest characters

This is a list of notable characters who have made guest appearances in the series:

Birand Tunca as Bisol - Titus' younger brother, he was taking a captured Şehzade Numan and his family to Templar Castle but was stopped and killed by Ertuğrul making Titus thirsty for his blood.
Diler Öztürk as Alptekin Bey - Father of Gökçe and Selcan, killed by Süleyman Şah for betraying him. Appears in Selcan's visions telling her to kill Süleyman Şah.
Demir Parscan as Toktamış Bey - Blood brother and companion of Candar Bey. Is poisoned to death by Ural, with the help of Simon, to increase his influence in the Çavdar tribe. Loosely based on Tokhtamysh, a leader of the Blue Horde.
Shabbir Jan as Mahmout dervish - a dervish that helped ertugrul bey find a place in the Byzantine border not shown after season 2
Imran Bakshi as Sheikh Edabali - son of mahmout dervish a young boy intrusted in Islam . App wears as a sheikh in kurulus osman

Oya Unustası as Sügay Hatun - Osman's milk mother who came to the Kayı tribe from a distant Turkmen tribe. Ertuğrul was out mourning Halime's death and the lack of milk for his son while she was out mourning her son's death. After she came to the Kayı, her tribe attempted to kidnap her multiple times but was saved by Alangoya. She isn't shown or mentioned in season 5, and therefore it is thought that she died or her problems with the other tribe were resolved and/or she returned after Osman was able to live without her milk.
Gönül Nagiyeva as Alangoya/ Almıla Hatun - The sister of Baycu Noyan. Is sent by her brother to infiltrate the Kayı under the fake name of 'Almıla Hatun'. She tries to kill Osman and cause chaos in the Kayı. Nagiyeva described her as "difficult to love", saying "she truly believed in her mission." Alangoya is eventually killed by Hayme Hatun.
Onur Senay as Atabey Ertokuş - One of Sultan Alaeddin's most trusted men, he sided with Ertugrul during the rumour of the Dodurga tribe thinking he was a traitor. After he is captured by Mongols, Ertugrul manages to rescue him, about to give important information to Ertugrul until he is martyred by Tangut. Based on Mübarizeddin Ertokuş.
Gizem Anci as Melike Hatun - Sultan Alaeddin Keykubat's second wife and Şehzade İzzettin Kılıçarslan mother. Step-mother of Şehzade Gıyaseddin. She is an Ayyubid princess. She along with her son are killed by Altun Aba on Mahperi Hatun and Emir Sadettin Köpek's orders when they were coming to Konya.
Ali Çakalgöz as Tekfur Andros' - The Tekfur of Karachisar Castle and the father of Helena. He sees Vasilius as his son. Is very proud of Ertuğrul after his alps save Helena. Is killed by Laskaris in the Hanali Bazar on Vasilius's order.

See also
List of Diriliş: Ertuğrul episodes
 List of Kuruluş: Osman characters
List of awards and nominations received by Diriliş: Ertuğrul

References

External links 
 List of Diriliş: Ertuğrul characters on IMDb

 
Lists of Turkish drama television series characters